The 2018 FIM Women's Motocross World Championship was the 14th Women's Motocross World Championship season. Kiara Fontanesi successfully defended her title, after taking her fifth title in 2017.

2018 Calendar
A 6-round calendar for the 2018 season was announced on 25 October 2017.

Participants

Riders Championship

Manufacturers Championship

References 

Womens
Women's Motocross World Championship
Women's Motocross World
Motocross